The Information is the tenth studio album by American musician Beck, released on October 3, 2006 by Interscope Records. It was produced and mixed by Nigel Godrich, with whom Beck recorded  Mutations (1998) and Sea Change (2002). Recording took place from 2003 to 2006, with Beck concurrently working on 2005's Guero with the Dust Brothers. The album received positive reviews from critics and made several publications' year-end lists.

Recording
Before its release, Beck said the album was not a "stripped down" record, in contrast with his previous Godrich collaborations, Mutations and Sea Change. According to Beck, "Nigel [Godrich] said he wanted to do a hip-hop record" before they began work on the album. "And in a way it is, and in a way it isn't. It has hip-hop songs, and my previous work with him was Mutations and Sea Change, these sort of introspective records, and so this new one is sort of bringing those two worlds together."

In an interview with the BBC, Beck said the album had been "painful" to make:

Artwork
The album was issued with a blank sleeve and booklet and one of four different sheets of stickers for fans to make their own album art. Beck explained to Wired magazine that he wanted no two copies of the CD cover to be the same: "The artwork is going to be customizable. The idea is to provide something that calls for interactivity." However, because the album art concept was seen as a gimmick to bolster retail sales, The Information was deemed ineligible to enter the UK Albums Chart.

Promotion
A series of low budget videos were made for every song on the album. Beck explained the making of these videos—which would also appear on video-sharing site YouTube—to Wired:

Beck leaked tracks and videos on his web site months ahead of the album's release. "We're moving into a time when the song and the imagery and video are all able to exist as one thing," said Beck. "It's not even technically an audio thing anymore. It's something else." He also remarked, "I've been trying to do something like this for the last three albums," having released several versions of his previous album Guero (2005), including a deluxe CD/DVD package and a remix album called Guerolito (2005). "The conventional ways aren't working like they used to, so now there's a willingness to try new things." 

The first single in North America was "Nausea", which was officially released to radio on September 5, 2006. The song was promoted with an official music video directed by Patrick Daughters. 

The first single in the UK was "Cellphone's Dead", with an official video directed by Michel Gondry. "Think I'm in Love" went to US radio as the second and final single and became a Modern Rock and Triple A radio hit, garnering renewed interest in The Information.

Release
Some copies of the album included a bonus DVD of the low budget music videos.

On February 27, 2007, a "deluxe version" of the album was released by Interscope. It included a DVD containing all of the music videos, several bonus tracks, all four sticker sheets and a disc consisting of six remixes of three songs.

Reception

Commercial
The album reached number 7 on the US Billboard 200, number 6 in Canada and number 31 on Australia's ARIA Albums Chart. As of July 2008, The Information had sold 434,000 copies in the United States.

Critical
Jon Pareles of The New York Times credited the album's dark themes as a reflection of the world's condition at the time and felt that Beck had made that apparent in the videos released alongside the album. Pareles described the album's approach as being a 1960s pop-infused sound with a more driven message. Mike Driver of Drowned in Sound suggested that The Information was a mature and honest attempt at a multiple genre production without recreating what Beck had already accomplished. Driver praised Beck's variation in vocal style, ability to create a logical flow of tracks and the album's reflection of his unpredictable styles. Barry Walters of The Village Voice described Beck as being as detached on The Information as he had ever been and opined that the band was far more energetic than he. Walters noted that Beck's work with Nigel Godrich was more sample-heavy than his collaborations with the Dust Brothers had been and felt that the album ultimately suffered from Beck's disconnected approach. Nate Patrin of Pitchfork reviewed the deluxe edition of the album, which he felt was mostly a cash-in on an overlooked album, but praised the disc of remixes, which included mixes by big name performers.

Rolling Stone magazine named The Information the 24th best album of 2006, while Spin magazine ranked it number 10 on their 40 Best Albums of 2006.

Retrospectively, Sean McCarthy of PopMatters felt The Information suffered from being overly long and was Beck's least interesting album, although he praised "Think I'm in Love," "Cellphone's Dead" and the title track.

Track listing

Deluxe version
Disc one contains the original 15-track album re-sequenced with "New Round" moved from track 7 to 14, "Dark Star" moved from track 8 to 7 and "Movie Theme" moved from track 14 to 8. The disc also includes all three Japanese bonus tracks from above for a total of 18 tracks.

The third disc contains the following music videos. Most of them homemade by Beck.

Sample credits
 "The Horrible Fanfare" section uses a sample of "Cellphone's Dead".
 "Landslide" section uses a sample from the song "Requiem pour un con" by the French singer Serge Gainsbourg.

Personnel

Beck – vocals, acoustic guitar, electric guitar, melodica, piano, organ, keyboards, programming, effects, scratching, sitar, bass guitar, harmonica, kalimba, percussion, drums, drum effects, glockenspiel, Game Boy
Nigel Godrich – keyboards, programming, effects, scratching, tambourine, percussion, background vocals, Speak 'n Spell, whistle, Tote-A-Tune, kalimba, drums, Game Boy
Jason Falkner – bass guitar, electric guitar, acoustic guitar, African bass, Moog bass, background vocals, percussion, drums
James Gadson – drums, percussion, background vocals
Joey Waronker – drums, percussion, background vocals
Smokey Hormel – intro sounds
Justin Meldal-Johnsen – intro sounds
Roger Manning Jr. – intro sounds
Alejandro "Alex" Acuna – percussion, background vocals
Brian LeBarton – Speak 'n Spell
Justin Stanley – electric guitar, acoustic guitar, background vocals, percussion, flute
Greg Kurstin – keyboards, berimbau, piano, bass keyboard, synthesizer, background vocals, acoustic guitar
DJ Z-Trip – scratching
Stevie Black – cello, percussion, background vocals
Lucia Ribisi – girl on "Cellphone's Dead"
Cosimo Hansen – talking
Harvey Mason – drums
Sean Davis – bass guitar
Rachel Shelley – shipping forecast
Suzie Katayama – strings
Charlie Bisharat – strings
Joel Derouin – strings
Charlie Bisharat – strings
Larry Corbett – strings
Roberto Cani – strings
Gerardo Hilera – strings
Natalie Leggett – strings
Tereza Stanislaw – strings
Josefina Vergara – strings
Armen Garabedian – strings
Rudolph Stein – strings
Brianna Bell – background vocals on "The Information"
Tiffani Fest – background vocals on "The Information"
Sage Mears – background vocals on "The Information"
Kimi Reichenberg – background vocals on "The Information"
Elisha Skorman – background vocals on "The Information"
Spike Jonze – talking on "Exoskeleton"
Dave Eggers – talking on "Exoskeleton"

Technical

David Campbell – string arrangements, conductor
Nigel Godrich – producer, mixing, engineer
Darrell Thorp – engineer
Seth Waldman – assistant engineer
Rouble Kapour – assistant engineer
Chris Steffen – assistant engineer
Zach Kasik – assistant engineer
Bob Ludwig – mastering
Mat Maitland – art direction, design, featured artist
Gerard Saint – art direction
Beck – art direction
Jody Barton – featured artist
Juliette Cezzar – featured artist
Estelle & Simon – featured artist
David Foldvari – featured artist
Genevieve Gauckler – featured artist
Michael Gillette – featured artist
Jasper Goodall – featured artist
Mercedes Helnwein – featured artist
Han Lee – featured artist
Ari Michelson – featured artist
Parra – featured artist
Melanie Pullen – featured artist
Gay Ribisi – featured artist
Aleksey Shirokov – featured artist
Will Sweeney – featured artist
Kam Tang – featured artist
Adam Tullie – featured artist
Kensei Yabuno – featured artist
Vania Zouravliov – featured artist
Greg Burne – artist coordinator
Richard Newton – artist coordinator

Charts

The United Kingdom's Official Charts Company deemed The Information ineligible to chart, as they felt its customizable sticker album art gave it "an unfair advantage" in terms of album sales.

Certifications

References

External links
 
 
 Video clips for The Information at YouTube

2006 albums
Beck albums
Albums arranged by David Campbell (composer)
Albums produced by Nigel Godrich
Interscope Records albums